DardeKasht (also Romanized as DārdeKāsht) is a village in Babol Kenar Rural District, Babol Kenar District, Babol County, Mazandaran Province, Iran. At the 2006 census, its population was 1,111, in 285 families.

References 

Populated places in Babol County